Severe Tropical Cyclone Hina in March 1997 was the worst tropical cyclone to affect the South Pacific island nation of Tonga since Cyclone Isaac in 1982. The system was first noted within the monsoon trough on March 11, 1997, as a weak shallow depression within the vicinity of Rotuma. Over the next two days, the depression remained near Rotuma with no preferred movement, as it started to develop further within favorable conditions for further development. The system was subsequently named Hina on March 15, after it had started to move eastwards and had passed to the southeast of Niulakita, Tuvalu. During that day the system moved south-eastwards and impacted Wallis and Futuna, before it passed over Tonga's southern islands of Tongatapu and 'Eua during March 16. During the systems post analysis it was determined that the warning centers had underestimated Hina's intensity as it passed over Tonga, after damage had been greater than expected in the island nation.

Within Tuvalu it was difficult to assess damage done by Hina alone, after Cyclone Gavin impacted the area a week earlier. Storm surge and strong winds from both cyclones caused a severe amount of coastal erosion on all of the country’s nine atolls, with about 6.7% of land washed into the sea. Hina caused no significant damage on Walls Island, while it caused some damage to crops and destroyed parts of the road on Futuna Island. As Hina affected Tonga, there were no casualties reported as the system affected the island nation, however, Vaiola Hospital reported that they had treated a number of patients for injuries that were caused during the systems aftermath. One indirect death was also reported, after a person suffering a heart attack while evacuating from his home. After the cyclone the Tongan Government requested and received emergency aid, from the governments of several countries including France, Australia, New Zealand, Japan and the United Kingdom. This was after the government had provided T$5 million (US$3.97 million), or about 5% of its national budget to facilitate the immediate start of emergency relief and repairs to essential services.

Meteorological history

During March 11, 1997, a shallow tropical depression developed within the monsoon trough near the Fijian Dependency: Rotuma. Over the next two days the depression remained near Rotuma with no preferred movement, as it started to develop further in an area of minimal vertical wind shear and good upper air divergence. During March 13, as the system moved northwards, the United States Joint Typhoon Warning Center (JTWC) subsequently initiated advisories on the system and designated it as Tropical Cyclone 33P. Early on March 15, after the system had passed near Niulakita, the depression developed into a category 1 tropical cyclone on the Australian tropical cyclone intensity scale and was named Hina by the Fiji Meteorological Service (FMS). After being named the system accelerated towards the south-southeast and an area of increasing vertical wind shear, as it passed near the west coast of Futuna Island. The system also crossed the 180th meridian during that day, which prompted the JTWC to pass the responsibility for warning the United States Government to the Naval Pacific Meteorology and Oceanography Center (NPMOC).

Hina subsequently passed over the islands of Tongatapu and ʻEua in southern Tonga at around 08:30 UTC and took less than 2 hours to inflict considerable damage on the islands. Over the next few days the system continued to move towards the south-southeast and gradually weakened, before the NPMOC issued its final advisory during March 18, as the system was undergoing a transition to become an extratropical cyclone.

After an analysis of the observed data and the damage in Tonga, the FMS estimated that Hina's landfall intensity was underestimated. The observed wind data suggested that the system had storm force sustained winds, but had peak gusts comparable to hurricane force. Furthermore, the lowest pressure values also indicated that the winds had to be stronger than estimated, for it to fit known wind-pressure relationships. It was subsequently deduced by the FMS that Hina was a minimal category 3 severe tropical cyclone, with peak 10-minute sustained wind speeds of  when it crossed the Tonga island of Tongatapu at around 08:30 UTC (21:30 UTC+13).

Preparations and impact
Cyclone Hina caused over  worth of damage and was indirectly responsible for one death as it affected Tuvalu, Wallis and Futuna and Tonga. The system's worst impact was reported on the Tongatapu and 'Eua, which are the southernmost islands of the Kingdom of Tonga. Due to the impact of this storm, the name Hina was retired from the tropical cyclone naming lists.

Tuvalu
On March 12, the FMS issued gale warnings for the southern islands of Tuvalu and a tropical cyclone alert for the rest of the archipelago. The gale warning was subsequently extended out to cover the whole of the archipelago during the next day, after marginal squally gale-force winds were observed to the north of the monsoon trough in association with the system. Cyclone Hina was the second of three tropical cyclones to affect Tuvalu during the 1996-97 cyclone season, after Cyclone Gavin had severely damaged the islands a weak earlier and Cyclone Keli affected the islands during June 1997.

Cyclone Gavin and Hina's waves, storm surge and strong winds both caused a severe amount of coastal erosion on all of the country’s nine atolls with about 6.7% of the land washed into the sea. Both cyclones caused severe coastal erosion and destruction to food crops, mostly to the southern islands of Niulakita and Nukulaelae, while damage in northern and central islands was confined mostly to houses.

Wallis and Futuna

As the system developed into a tropical cyclone during March 14, gale warnings were issued for the French territory of Wallis and Futuna. Cyclone Hina was the second of four tropical cyclones to affect Wallis and Futuna in a ten-month period, after Cyclone Gavin had severely damaged food crops ten days earlier and Cyclones Keli and Ron affected the islands during June 1997 and January 1998. Hina caused no significant damage on Walls Island, while it caused some damage to the crops and destroyed parts of the road on Futuna.

Tonga
Hina was the first of three tropical cyclones to affect Tonga during a ten-month period, with Cyclones Keli and Ron affecting the island nation during June 1997 and January 1998. Late on March 15, ahead of the system affecting Tonga, gale warnings were issued for the Southern Tongan island groups of Haʻapai, Tongatapu and Vavaʻu. During the next day, Hina took less than two hours to inflict considerable damage on the Tongan islands and became the worst tropical cyclone to affect Tonga since Cyclone Isaac during 1982. The two worst-affected Tongan islands were Tongatapu and 'Eua after major damages were reported on both islands. As the system impacted Tonga, the FMS received several reports of one or more tornadoes occurring in Tonga; however, during a post-disaster survey no evidence was found to prove or disprove this claim. It was noted that several of the badly damaged houses had little or no cyclone protection while over 600 people were left homeless. Damages were greater than had been expected, with an estimated damage total of about  Tongan Pa'anga reported. A post disaster survey attributed the greater damages to higher than expected wind gusts caused by either a low level squall or a jet streak. There were no casualties reported as the system affected the island nation, however, Vaiola Hospital reported that they had treated a number of patients for injuries that were caused during the system's aftermath. One indirect death was also reported, after a sea captain suffered a heart attack while evacuating from his home. Within the islands severe damage to power lines and telecommunication systems was reported. The system affected the islands after the lowest tide for the day, as a result sea damage was minimal, though some evidence of salt damage to taro plantations was observed.

Some of the coconut palms were snapped, which suggested that wind gusts of between  had been experienced on the island. Within Nukuʻalofa the capital city of Tonga, there was not a lot of structural damage reported; however, the villages to the east of the capital were severely affected. The roof and grand stand of Teufaiva Stadium was blown off, while the Parliament house, government buildings and schools were severely damaged. The MV Lofa was driven by fierce winds onto Mounu Reef in Nuku'alofa Harbour. Some of the uprooted trees knocked down power lines, sometimes causing a domino effect of bringing down additional power poles. As a result of the electric problems, there was a lack of electrical power to power pumps, with the water supply becoming intermittent. On 'Eua Island, Hina was estimated to have caused greater damage then Cyclone Isaac had done fifteen years previously, after the island was completely devastated by the system.

During the system's aftermath, insurance companies flew in people to assess the damage, while agricultural authorities on Tongatapu and 'Eua advised landowners to plant fast maturing produce such as sweet potatoes. The Tongan Government provided  or about 5% of its national budget to facilitate the immediate start of emergency relief and repairs to essential services. Tents were supplied by the National Disaster Committee and Ministry of Works to act as temporary shelters for those who were homeless after the system. By March 19, the Tonga Electric Power Board had restored electricity to several consumers including major government buildings and the Nuku'alofa Business District. However, several consumers were expected to be without electric until at least June 1997. On March 25, the Acting Prime Minister of Tonga convened a meeting of donors, where an official request for international assistance was presented. At the meeting donors were requested to review existing of proposed bilateral programs, to see if they can be adjusted or brought forward to cater for the repairs or rebuilding of schools and other government buildings. The New Zealand Government deployed to Tonga, four electricity line mechanics, a fully equipped truck, along with various supplies including tarpaulins, blankets and electric.

The Government of the United Kingdom granted  for ten emergency generators, while the Chinese Government pledged . Australia provided  for temporary roof repairs and equipment to restore electricity supplies in both Tongatapu and 'Eua. By early September 1997, the reconstruction of primary school buildings damaged by the cyclone had been completed after the Tongan Government funded the project. New accommodation for primary school teachers in the Ha'apai islands and the Niuas was also completed after the Australian and New Zealand Governments funded the projects.

See also

Cyclone Evan

Notes

References

External links

1996–97 South Pacific cyclone season
Category 3 South Pacific cyclones
Tropical cyclones in Tuvalu
Tropical cyclones in Wallis and Futuna
Tropical cyclones in Tonga
Retired South Pacific cyclones
1997 in Tuvalu
1997 in Tonga
1997 in Wallis and Futuna